The Minister of State at the Department of Agriculture, Food and the Marine is a junior ministerial post in the Department of Agriculture, Food and the Marine of the Government of Ireland and assists the Minister for Agriculture, Food and the Marine. A Minister of State does not hold cabinet rank.

There are currently two Ministers of State, who were appointed in 2020:
Senator Pippa Hackett – Minister of State with responsibility for Land Use and Biodiversity; and
Martin Heydon, TD – Minister of State with responsibility for Research & Development, Farm Safety and New Market Development.

List of Parliamentary Secretaries

List of Ministers of State

References

Agriculture
Department of Agriculture, Food and the Marine